The Kermanshah leaf-toed gecko (Asaccus kermanshahensis) is a species of gecko endemic to Iran. It is named for the type locality, north of Kermanshah, eastern Kermanshah Province, in the Zagros Mountains of western Iran.

Description
It is a medium-sized Asaccus gecko with 4 pairs of postmental scales, a small ear opening, and a depressed, pointed head. Most of the dorsal surfaces have numerous large, smooth tubercles, distinguishing it from other similar Asaccus species.

References

Asaccus
Reptiles of Iran
Endemic fauna of Iran
Reptiles described in 1996